Hatice Sultan (respectful lady; Trabzon, c.1490/93 - Costantinople, after 1543) was an Ottoman princess, daughter of Sultan Selim I and Hafsa Sultan. She was the sister of Sultan Suleiman the Magnificent.

Biography
Hatice's birth date is unknown, but she had to be born before 1494. She was the daughter of Şehzade Selim (the future Selim I) and his concubine Hafsa. She married Damat Iskender Pasha in 1509, an Ottoman governor and later admiral who was executed in 1515.

It had long been believed that Hatice Sultan subsequently married the Grand Vizier Pargalı Ibrahim Pasha. However, in the late 2000s, research conducted by the historian Ebru Turan revealed that this claim was not based on solid evidence, and that in fact no such marriage ever took place between them. As a result, historians now agree that Ibrahim married another woman, Muhsine Hatun, and not Hatice. In 1517 she secondly married instead Çoban Mustafa Pasha, the son of Iskender Pasha and widower of Hatice's half-sister Şahzade Sultan. Hatice widowed in 1529. 

Hatice Sultan had her mosque built in Aksaray in 1543-44 and later died and was buried in a separate tomb next to her parents in the graveyard of Yavuz Sultan Selim Mosque. She was buried next to her sister Hafize Sultan.

Issue 
Hatice Sultan had five sons and at least three daughters. 

By her first marriage, Hatice had four sons and a daughter:
 Sultanzade Mehmed Bey
 Sultanzade Süleyman Bey
 Sultanzade Ali Bey
 Sultanzade Osman Bey
 Nefise Hanımsultan
By her second marriage, Hatice had a son and at least two daughters:
 Sultanzade Mehmed Bey II (presumably, the first Mehmed died as an infant)
 Hanim Hanımsultan
 At least one other daughter

Depictions in literature and popular culture
In the TV series Muhteşem Yüzyıl, Hatice Sultan is played by Turkish-German actress Selma Ergeç. In the series, she is inaccurately portrayed as Ibrahim Pasha's wife and mother of his children, a fact which other historians have disputed. However, the series was produced in 2011, when the marriage had not yet been denied with certainty.

Source
Necdet Sakaoğlu, Bu mülkün kadın sultanları: Vâlide sultanlar, hâtunlar, hasekiler, kadınefendiler, sultanefendiler, Oğlak Yayıncılık, 2008
Leslie Peirce, The Imperial Harem: Women and Sovereignty in the Ottoman Empire, Oxford University Press, Oxford, 1993
Ebru Turan, The Marriage of Ibrahim Pasha (ca. 1495-1536): The Rise of Sultan Süleyman's Favorite to the Grand Vizierate and the Politics of the Elites in the Early Sixteenth-Century Ottoman Empire, Turcica, 2009

See also 
Ottoman family tree
Ottoman Emperors family tree (simplified)

References

16th-century Ottoman princesses
Suleiman the Magnificent